Ichthyophis dulitensis is a species of caecilian in the family Ichthyophiidae. It is endemic to Borneo and only known from near its type locality, Mount Dulit in northern Sarawak, Malaysia, after which it is named. Described by Edward Harrison Taylor in 1960, the holotype was collected by Charles Hose already in 1891. It is a poorly known species with uncertain taxonomic status. Common name Mount Dulit caecilian has been coined for it.

Description
Ichthyophis dulitensis is a moderately slender caecilian. The eyes are small with white pupils and black iris. Tail is short, . The skin has about 313 ring-shaped folds (annuli). The throat has a creamy spot.

Habitat and conservation
It presumably inhabits tropical moist forest. Adults are likely subterranean. The threats to this species are unknown.

References

dulitensis
Endemic fauna of Borneo
Endemic fauna of Malaysia
Amphibians of Malaysia
Amphibians described in 1960
Taxa named by Edward Harrison Taylor
Taxonomy articles created by Polbot
Amphibians of Borneo